Simon Cooper is a British banker. Since 2018 he has been the chief executive officer of the Corporate, Commercial and Institutional Banking division of Standard Chartered, its largest global business with approximately USD8.4 billion in underlying operating income. He also serves as CEO of the bank’s Europe and Americas region and is chairman of the group’s global Diversity and Inclusion Council. 

Cooper has been in banking for three decades, much of that time at HSBC in roles across Asia and the Middle East including chief executive of Global Commercial Banking, CEO of HSBC Middle East and North Africa, CEO of Korea and head of corporate and investment banking in Singapore.

Professional career

HSBC Group 
Cooper joined the London merchant bank Samuel Montagu & Co. in 1989, as a graduate trainee. Following Samuel Montagu's acquisition by HSBC Group, Cooper became a director in corporate finance with the HSBC in London, Hong Kong and Singapore. Later roles included president and CEO HSBC Korea, managing director and head of Corporate and Investment banking in Singapore and deputy CEO and head of Corporate and Investment Banking in HSBC Thailand. He was appointed a Group General Manager of HSBC in May 2008 and responsible for HSBC’s business in the MENA region, and was latterly group managing director and chief executive, Global Commercial Banking.

Cooper was a board member of HSBC Bank Middle East Limited (Deputy Chairman), HSBC Bank Egypt S.A.E. (Chairman), HSBC Bank Oman SAOG (Chairman) and The Saudi British Bank.

Standard Chartered Bank 
On 17 December 2015, Standard Chartered Bank announced the appointment of Cooper to head its Corporate and Institutional Banking business, effective April 2016, based in Singapore. He took responsibility for the group's commercial bank two years later, creating the Corporate, Commercial and Institutional Banking (CCIB) division, providing services to companies and financial institutions in approximately fifty markets around the world.

References

Year of birth missing (living people)
British bankers
Living people